"The Fighter" is a song by American rap rock band Gym Class Heroes, from their fifth studio album The Papercut Chronicles II. The song features vocals from American singer-songwriter and record producer Ryan Tedder of the band OneRepublic, and was released as the third and final single from the album on November 8, 2011. It was featured in the season finale of 90210 season 4 and the Cathay Pacific television commercial for the 2013 Hong Kong Sevens, as well as the background music of the introduction video of F1 2014.

Music video
The music video for "The Fighter" was filmed in April 2012. It was released to YouTube on May 24, 2012. The video features American gymnast John Orozco.  It depicts Tedder playing at an upright piano, and the band members around him singing and playing their instruments.  Shots of Orozco doing Olympic training in a gym, as well as clips of home video of him competing as a child are shown in between. The single was written by several writers, including all four Gym Class Heroes members, Tedder, Noel Zancanella and Jamie Heffernan.

Track listing

Charts

Weekly charts

Year-end charts

Certifications

Cover version
"The Fighter" was covered by alternative rock band Paradise Fears in 2012.

References

2011 songs
2011 singles
Gym Class Heroes songs
Songs written by Travie McCoy
Songs written by Ryan Tedder
Songs written by Matt McGinley
Songs written by Noel Zancanella
Song recordings produced by Ryan Tedder
Fueled by Ramen singles